= The Humongous Book of Dinosaurs =

Children's book by David Norman

- First edition cover
- Author: David Norman
- Publisher: Stewart, Tabori, & Chang
- Publication date: April 1, 1997
- Pages: 1,256
- ISBN: 978-1-55670596-0

The Humongous Book of Dinosaurs is a 1997 nonfiction children's book by David Norman about dinosaurs. It was published by Stewart, Tabori, & Chang Publishers and has 1,256 pages.

== Bibliography ==
- Stewart, Tabori & Chang (1997). The Humongous Book of Dinosaurs. New York: Stewart, Tabori & Chang. OCLC 36301321. ISBN 1556705964

== Sources ==
- "Fleshing out the beast: Artist uses fact and fantasy to re-create dinosaurs". The Atlanta Journal-Constitution. May 12, 1997. (subscription required)
